Notoreas chioneres is a species of moth in the family Geometridae. This species is endemic to New Zealand.

Taxonomy
This species was described by Louis Beethoven Prout in 1939 using material collected at Obelisk, Old Man Range in Otago by George Howes. In 1986 Robin C. Craw reviewed the genus Notoreas and confirmed the inclusion of N. chioneres within it. The holotype specimen is held at the Natural History Museum, London.

Description
This species has a wingspan of 23 mm and is similar in appearance to N. isoleuca.

Distribution
This species is endemic to New Zealand. It is found in the mountain ranges of Central Otago as well as in the Kakanui Mountains at altitudes of between 1200 and 1500 metres.

Biology and behaviour
This species is a day flying moth. It is on the wing from December to February. Adult moths, when settled, continue to vibrate their wings ensuring they are immediately ready to take off should they be disturbed. Although they prefer sunshine they will continue to fly when conditions are cloudy. They fly relatively low to the ground. When resting for long periods they adopt the posture of holding their wings together above their body.

Habitat and host species

This species frequents alpine herbfield habitat. The larvae of this species feed on Kelleria villosa.

References

Moths described in 1939
Moths of New Zealand
Larentiinae
Endemic fauna of New Zealand
Taxa named by Louis Beethoven Prout
Endemic moths of New Zealand